"Private Life" is a 1980 song written by Chrissie Hynde, and released by both English band The Pretenders, and Jamaican singer Grace Jones in 1980.

Background
The song was written by Chrissie Hynde, the leader and singer of The Pretenders, and included on that band's 1980 debut album Pretenders. The same year the track was covered by Grace Jones on her first post-disco album Warm Leatherette, recorded at the Compass Point Studios in the Bahamas with among others Sly and Robbie. In the liner notes to Island Records' 1998 compilation Private Life: The Compass Point Sessions, Hynde is quoted as saying: 

"Private Life" was released as the third single from the Warm Leatherette album. However, it marked a new era in Jones' career as she left her disco persona behind her and adopted an entirely different image, exploring genres like reggae, rock and new wave. It became Grace Jones' first ever chart entry in the UK, peaking at number 17. The single's B-side was a non-album track; "She's Lost Control", originally recorded by Joy Division. Both tracks were remixed and re-edited for the 7" single with the 4:38 version of "Private Life", now available on the Spectrum/Universal Music for Girls Night Out compilation CD. The original 7" version of "She's Lost Control" is still yet to be released digitally. In the Netherlands the B-side was the French language "Pars" from the Warm Leatherette album. In Germany, "La Vie en rose" from Portfolio (1977) was re-issued as a follow-up single to "Private Life" whereas the UK and the Netherlands opted for "The Hunter Gets Captured by the Game", which had already been the lead single off Warm Leatherette for the American market.

Following the release of the compilation Island Life in 1985, the song was remixed and re-issued as a single in the UK, then with "My Jamaican Guy" as the B-side, and charted again.

Music video
The original video for this song, directed by Mike Mansfield, presented the famous Grace Jones mask for the first time. The entire video shows Jones' face in close-up, with her taking the mask off, replacing it, and then taking it off again, and mostly singing straight to the camera. The clip was filmed in a single take, without any editing.

Another music video for the song was produced, which was included in the program of the 1982 A One Man Show VHS release. It again presented Jones in a close-up, with her face partially covered with shadows, as well as posing in front of a white wall.

Track listing
7" single (1980)
A. "Private Life" – 4:37
B. "She's Lost Control" – 3:45

NL 7" single (1980)
A. "Private Life" – 4:36
B. "Pars" – 4:05

12" single (1980)
A. "Private Life" (Long Version) – 6:19
B. "She's Lost Control" (Long Version) – 8:25

7" single (1986)
A. "Private Life" – 3:57
B. "My Jamaican Guy" – 4:16

12" single (1986)
A1. "Private Life" – 7:00
A2. "My Jamaican Guy" – 6:00
B1. "Feel Up" – 6:14
B2. "She's Lost Control" – 5:45

Chart positions

References

1980 singles
Grace Jones songs
The Pretenders songs
Songs written by Chrissie Hynde
Song recordings produced by Chris Thomas (record producer)
Reggae rock songs
1979 songs
Island Records singles